Roosevelt Collins Jr. (born January 25, 1968) is a former American football linebacker who played one season with the Miami Dolphins of the National Football League.  He was drafted by the Miami Dolphins in the sixth round of the 1992 NFL Draft. He played college football at Texas Christian University and attended Booker T. Washington High School in Shreveport, Louisiana. Collins was also a member of the Sacramento Gold Miners, San Antonio Texans and Amsterdam Admirals in Europe.

Professional career

Miami Dolphins
Collins was selected by the Miami Dolphins with the 155th pick in the 1992 NFL Draft. He played in ten games for the Dolphins during the 1992 season.

Sacramento Gold Miners
Collins appeared in four games for the Sacramento Gold Miners of the Canadian Football League in 1994.

San Antonio Texans
Collins played in 18 games for the San Antonio Texans of the Canadian Football League in 1995.

Amsterdam Admirals
Collins was drafted by the Amsterdam Admirals in the ninth round with the 51st pick in the 1997 World League of American Football Draft and played for them during the 1997 season.

References

External links
Just Sports Stats

Living people
1968 births
Players of American football from Louisiana
American football linebackers
Canadian football linebackers
African-American players of American football
African-American players of Canadian football
TCU Horned Frogs football players
Miami Dolphins players
Sacramento Gold Miners players
San Antonio Texans players
Amsterdam Admirals players
People from Shreveport, Louisiana
21st-century African-American sportspeople
20th-century African-American sportspeople
American expatriate players of American football